Ben Clucas (born 28 January 1984) is a British racing driver.

Clucas was born in Frimley.  He has competed in such series as Formula 3 Euro Series, Toyota Racing Series and the British Formula 3 Championship. Clucas won the 2006 Australian Drivers' Championship for Team BRM and the GT Light class of the Spanish GT Championship in 2009 with Francisco Lorena. In 2019, Clucas competed in the Dunlop Endurance Championship in a Porsche 997 Cup.

24 Hours of Silverstone results

References

External links
 Official website
 Career statistics from Driver Database

1984 births
Living people
People from Frimley
English racing drivers
Formula Ford drivers
British Formula Renault 2.0 drivers
German Formula Renault 2.0 drivers
Italian Formula Renault 2.0 drivers
Formula 3 Euro Series drivers
British Formula Three Championship drivers
Australian Formula 3 Championship drivers
Japanese Formula 3 Championship drivers
Toyota Racing Series drivers
Supercars Championship drivers
British GT Championship drivers
Britcar drivers
Britcar 24-hour drivers
24H Series drivers

Fluid Motorsport Development drivers
Prema Powerteam drivers